Government Medical College (formerly known as Rajiv Gandhi Institute of Medical Sciences) is a medical institute located in Ongole, Andhra Pradesh. It is affiliated to Dr. NTR University of Health Sciences.

Intake
The present intake is 120 seats

References

External links
 

Medical colleges in Andhra Pradesh
Ongole
Universities and colleges in Prakasam district
2008 establishments in Andhra Pradesh
Educational institutions established in 2008